Frederick Cox may refer to:
Frederick Cox (priest) (1821–1906), Dean of Hobart
Frederick Pete Cox (born 1953), American serial killer
Frederick Cox (cattleman), with Crawford Clarke, owner of Cox & Clark Trading Post and Steamboat Landing
Fred Cox (1938–2019), NFL kicker for the Minnesota Vikings
Freddie Cox (1920–1973), English football player and manager
Fred Cox (died 2013), British entertainer  as part of The Cox Twins
Fred Cox (politician) (born 1961), Utah politician

See also
 Frederic Cox (1905–1985), British singer, composer and music educator
Frederick Cocks (disambiguation)